HMS Peyton was a  which served with the Royal Navy during the First World War. The M class were an improvement on the preceding , capable of higher speed. Launched on 2 May 1916, the vessel served in anti-submarine and escort duties based at Cobh in Ireland. The destroyer attacked the German submarine  and rescued crews from friendly merchant ships that had been sunk. After the end of the war, Peyton was placed in reserve and subsequently broken up on 9 May 1921.

Design and development
Peyton was one of sixteen s ordered by the British Admiralty in May 1915 as part of the Fifth War Construction Programme. The M-class was an improved version of the earlier  destroyers, designed to reach a higher speed in order to counter rumoured German fast destroyers, although it later transpired the German capability had been overstated.

Displacement was  normal and  full load.

Armament consisted of three  Mk IV QF guns on the ship's centreline, with one on the forecastle, one aft on a raised platform and one between the middle and aft funnels. A single 2-pounder (40 mm) pom-pom anti-aircraft gun was carried, while torpedo armament consisted of two twin mounts for  torpedoes. The ship had a complement of 76 officers and ratings.

Construction and career
Peyton was laid down by William Denny and Brothers of Dumbarton on 12 July 1915 with the yard number 1053, launched on 2 May the following year and completed on 29 June. The ship was named after Rear Admiral John Peyton, the captain of the third-rate ship of the line . The vessel was deployed as part of the Grand Fleet, joining the newly-formed Fourteenth Destroyer Flotilla.

On February 1917, the destroyer was transferred to Cobh, Ireland, to counter increasing activity by German submarines in the Southwest Approaches. On 23 July, the destroyer, along with Narwhal, attacked the German submarine , which was ultimately interred on 29 July at Ferrol. Sometimes, the patrols were unsuccessful at deterring submarine attack and the vessels then rescued the survivors from the sunk ships.

Peyton returned to the Fourteenth and served there until the end of the war. After the armistice, the Royal Navy returned to a peacetime level of mobilisation, and surplus vessels were retired. Peyton was initially placed in reserve at Portsmouth alongside fifty other destroyers. Peyton was sold to be broken up by Thos. W. Ward at Morecambe on 9 May 1921.

Pennant numbers

References

Citations

Bibliography

 
 
 
 
 
 
 
 
 
 
 

1916 ships
Admiralty M-class destroyers
Ships built on the River Clyde
World War I destroyers of the United Kingdom